

Cyrtodactylus collegalensis, also known as the Kollegal ground gecko or forest spotted gecko, is a species of gecko found in and around Mysore hills, at the junction of the Western Ghats and the Eastern Ghats, in South India. Recent taxonomic works and genetic studies revealed that the formerly-supposed genus is actually a subgenus of the widespread genus Cyrtodactylus. It is often confused with the forest spotted gecko (Cyrtodactylus speciosus).

Habits and habitat
They are primarily ground-dwelling, hiding under thick leaf-litter. They are nocturnal, insectivorous and are thought to be oviparous. Some species in this group have been documented to lay eggs. They live in forests, be it dry, mixed or wet in complexion, mainly along the hilly tracts.

Distribution
The gecko was described in 1870 from BR Hills in Southern Karnataka. It was treated as synonymous with Cyrtodactylus nebulosus by Boulenger. It has later been reported from found in adjacent hill ranges of Eastern Ghats and Western Ghats, at the junction of Maharashtra, Karnataka, Kerala and Tamil Nadu states, in South India. In Sri Lanka, its presence is considered dubious.

Notes

References
 
 
 
 Agarwal, I., Mirza, Z. A., Pal, S., Maddock, S. T., Mishra, A., & Bauer, A. M. (2016). A new species of the Cyrtodactylus (Geckoella) collegalensis (Beddome, 1870) complex (Squamata: Gekkonidae) from Western India. Zootaxa, 4170(2), 339–354.
 Agarwal, I. (2016). Two new species of ground-dwelling Cyrtodactylus (Geckoella) from the Mysore Plateau, south India. Zootaxa, 4193(2), 228–244.

External links

 

Cyrtodactylus
Reptiles of India
Endemic fauna of India
Taxa named by Richard Henry Beddome
Reptiles described in 1870